The 1914 United States Senate election in North Dakota took place on November 3, 1914. Incumbent Senator Asle Gronna, a Republican, sought re-election in his first popular election. Against several strong challengers, he won the Republican primary, though only with a plurality. In the general election, he faced former U.S. Senator William E. Purcell, the Democratic nominee. Gronna ultimately had little difficulty defeating Purcell to win re-election.

Democratic Primary

Candidates
 William E. Purcell, former U.S. Senator
 George P. Jones, former LaMoure County State's Attorney, 1912 Democratic candidate for Governor

Results

Republican Primary

Candidates
 Asle Gronna, incumbent U.S. Senator
 John W. Worst, President of North Dakota Agricultural College
 Andrew Miller, Attorney General of North Dakota
 Herman N. Midtbo, perennial candidate

Results

General election

Results

References

North Dakota
1914
1914 North Dakota elections